Abu Hreik  is a Syrian village located in Al-Saan Subdistrict in Salamiyah District, Hama.  According to the Syria Central Bureau of Statistics (CBS), Abu Hreik had a population of 533 in the 2004 census. Abu Hreik was captured by SAA in 22 January 2018 from ISIS during the Northwestern Syria offensive.

References 

Populated places in Salamiyah District